Dendropsophus goughi, the Guianan dwarf tree frog, is a species of frog in the family Hylidae.  It is endemic to Trinidad.  Scientists have seen it as high as 1200 meters above sea level.

For a time, scientists considered this frog conspecific with Dendropsophus microcephalus.

See also
''Dendropsophus minutus, lesser treefrog

References

Frogs of South America
goughi